The 1993 British League season was the 59th season of the top tier of speedway in the United Kingdom and the 29th known as the British League.

Summary
Belle Vue Aces won their first title since 1982. The Manchester team relied on a group of consistent riders, with no rider exceeding a 9 point average but five riders ranging from 8.75 to 6.72. The team consisted of World Under-21 champion Joe Screen, Australian Jason Lyons, Americans Bobby Ott and Shawn Moran and Dane Frede Schött. The Championship was the closest in British League history with Belle Vue finishing on the same points as Wolverhampton Wolves and taking the title on heat points difference. It all came down to the last match when Belle Vue visited Wolves and pulled off a 54-53 victory. Wolves who were clear at the top of the table earlier in the season suffered a series of unfortunate injuries and were missing four riders towards the end of the season. 

Oxford Cheetahs dropped out of the first division resulting in their three time World Champion Hans Nielsen moving to Coventry Bees and Martin Dugard joining Eastbourne Eagles.

Final table
M = Matches; W = Wins; D = Draws; L = Losses; Pts = Total Points

British League Knockout Cup
The 1993 Speedway Star British League Knockout Cup was the 55th edition of the Knockout Cup for tier one teams. Bradford Dukes were the winners for a third consecutive year.

First round

Quarter-finals

Semi-finals

Final

First leg

Second leg

Bradford Dukes were declared Knockout Cup Champions, winning on aggregate 111-105.

Leading averages

Riders & final averages
Arena Essex

 9.49
 8.42
 8.34
 7.16
 7.12
 6.84
 6.07
 5.78
 4.31
 3.16
 1.23

Belle Vue

 8.75
 8.17
 7.90
 7.58
 6.72
 5.77
 5.63
 5.17
 4.84
 4.18
 3.69
 3.45

Bradford

 8.89
 8.86
 7.60
 7.21
 6.75
 5.34
 4.80
 4.76
 4.32
 3.46
 0.67

Coventry

 10.05
 7.76
 7.71
 7.47
 6.75
 5.42
 4.07
 3.27
 3.20
 3.14
 2.50

Cradley Heath

 9.85
 8.99
 22
 6.15
 5.95
 5.84
 5.20
 4.64
 4.56
 3.22

Eastbourne

 8.98
 8.02
 7.33
 7.04
 6.91
 6.53
 5.73
 5.48
 3.80
 3.04
 1.52

Ipswich

 9.01
 8.36
 6.85
 6.62
 6.00
 5.98
 5.91
 4.99
 4.63
 4.32
 3.51
 1.57

King's Lynn

 9.27
 7.96
 6.90
 6.16
 5.99
 5.16
 4.98
 4.70
 3.11
 3.10
 3.03

Poole

 7.40
 6.97
 6.77
 6.76
 6.31
 5.63
 5.14
 4.72
 4.37
 3.46

Reading

 10.34
 7.88
 7.39
 6.83
 6.10
 5.66
 4.83
 4.37
 3.19

Wolverhampton

 11.12
 9.62
 8.10
 6.70
 6.33
 6.04
 5.98
 4.62
 4.14
 3.90
 3.63
 1.82

See also
 List of United Kingdom Speedway League Champions
 Knockout Cup (speedway)

References

British League
1993 in British motorsport
1993 in speedway